The Caproni Ca.9 was a single-engine monoplane designed and built by Caproni in the early 1910s.

Design
The Ca.9 was very similar to the Caproni Ca.8 in being a modern high wing monoplane with a wooden structure and canvas covering, equipped with a wing warping system to control roll and reinforced by metal tie rods connected to the fuselage and to a special structure placed above it; the fuselage was based on a wooden lattice structure, in turn reinforced by metal cables, and was covered in cloth only for the front half; the same wooden structure with a canvas covering characterized the empennages. The trolley, fixed, was composed of two front wheels with anti-overblank pads and another smaller, tailed shoe. The engine, which operated a fixed-pitch, two-bladed wooden propeller, was a Y-shaped three-cylinder Anzani capable of developing a power output of 35 hp (25.76 kW).

Career

Specifications

See also 
 Giovanni Battista Caproni
 Museo dell'Aeronautica Gianni Caproni

References

Ca.009
Aircraft first flown in 1911
Experimental aircraft